Alaska Whale Foundation (AWF) is a non-governmental organization founded in 1996 and based in Warm Springs Bay, Alaska, that studies humpbacks and their habitat in Southeast Alaska. AWF maintains the Coastal Research and Education Center, a permanent research base on Baranof Island.

Since its foundation, AWF has conducted a number of research projects in Southeast Alaska including investigations into whale acoustics, cooperative bubble-netting, cow-calf relationships and prey dynamics.

AWF has also collaborated with UC Davis and Search for ExtraTerrestrial (SETI) Institute to study the impact of boat noise on humpback behavior. AWF is part of the Alaska Region Marine Mammal Stranding Network and participates in marine mammal stranding response May through September.

In 2010 the organization maintained a research vessel, Evolution.

Scientists at the foundation make presentations to inform other researchers and the public about whale behavior.  Its members also participate in the Whale Entanglement Team, helping to save whales caught in netting.

References

1996 establishments in Alaska
Non-profit organizations based in Alaska
Scientific organizations established in 1996
Sitka, Alaska
Whale conservation